Carlos Arnoldo Salcido Flores (born 2 April 1980) is a Mexican former professional footballer. He started his career as a centre-back and played most of it as left-back, then converted to defensive midfielder and ended it as centre-back. He won the 2012 Olympic gold medal.

After emerging through Guadalajara's youth system, he went on to be a mainstay for PSV Eindhoven, acting as vice-captain for the Dutch team and was the first player from Mexico to be champion in the Eredivise. Salcido also played a season for Fulham before returning to Mexico with Tigres UANL. In 2014 he returned to Guadalajara, winning the league title with the club in 2017.

Internationally, Salcido represented the national team in three World Cups: 2006, 2010, 2014 and three Gold Cups: 2005, 2007, 2011, He was a member of Mexico's team that won the gold medal at the 2012 Summer Olympics. He made his first national team appearance at the age of 24 in 2004. In 2014, after the World Cup in Brazil, Salcido officially retired from the national team.

Salcido served as the first president of the Liga de Balompié Mexicano.

Club career

Guadalajara
Carlos Salcido began his football career at his nearby home town team Chivas. He progressed through the ranks having successful seasons with the youth teams until he was called up to the national team in 2001, making his official debut in the Primera División de México on 22 July 2001 in a 1–1 draw against La Piedad in 2001. Salcido disappeared from Chivas' first squad until 2003, when he regained trust as a good defender. He would go on to play five half-seasons registering two goals in 105 matches. Salcido was a 2005 and 2006 Copa Libertadores Semifinalist with Guadalajara and a Runner-Up in Primera División (First Division), losing against Pumas in penalty shoot-outs in 2004. Salcido made his final league appearance for Guadalajara on 1 April 2006 against Pachuca in a 3–2 win.

PSV Eindhoven 
In June and July following the 2006 FIFA World Cup, press speculation linked Salcido to several clubs in Europe, with one report claiming that he had agreed to sign for FA Premier League club Arsenal F.C. However, these speculations proved false as he signed a four-year contract with Dutch champions PSV Eindhoven on 10 July 2006.

Salcido was a first team regular in the Eredivisie under Coach Ronald Koeman, starting 33 of 34 league games in his first season at the club, which saw PSV crowned Dutch champions. On 18 November 2006, he scored his first goal in Europe, a spectacular long-distance goal in a match against Excelsior Rotterdam that ended 4–0. Salcido also appeared in the 2006–07 UEFA Champions League. In total Salcido played 48 Eredivisie and Champions League games that season, finishing 46 of them. For the 2007–08 season, Salcido was awarded the number 3 shirt, previously worn by Michael Reiziger. He was also named the team Vice-Captain after Timmy Simons was promoted to team Captain following the departure of former captain Phillip Cocu. In his second season at PSV Salcido played 33 games in the Dutch League, and 6 games in the Champions League, Salcido was crowned champion for the second straight year with PSV. In his third season with the club he played 28 games in the Dutch League scoring two goals. In 2009–10 Salcido played 27 Eredivisie matches and 9 UEFA Europa League matches. Salcido was a substitute for the beginning of the 2010–11 Eredivisie and the Europa League, where he did not appear in any matches but was soon transferred to Fulham of England.

Fulham
After a good performance with Mexico at the 2010 FIFA World Cup, it was reported that Liverpool wanted to sign Salcido.

On 26 August 2010 it was announced that Fulham had agreed a £3.6 million deal with PSV to sign the player but the deal was still subject to the player agreeing terms. The deal was then finalised the next day. He made his debut against Blackburn Rovers on 18 September 2010. He contributed an assist in the 56th minute, when his cross pass fell to American player Clint Dempsey, who headed it into the net from 8 yards to level the game at 1–1. He played all 90 minutes. He left the club in August 2011 on loan to club Tigres UANL.

Tigres UANL

On 17 August 2011, it was announced that Salcido was transferred to Mexican side Tigres UANL on a season-long loan. After a robbery at his home in Claygate, London, Salcido requested to be transferred back to Mexico due to his family feeling unsettled. In his first season back in Mexico, Salcido helped Tigres win their third league title, and their first title in over thirty years.

On 7 March 2012, Fulham confirmed that Salcido had joined Tigres on a permanent basis.

Return to Guadalajara
On 20 May 2014, Guadalajara officially announced the signing of Salcido. After his participation at the World Cup, Salcido made his debut for Chivas de Guadalajara in a pre-season friendly match 9 July 2014 at the StubHub Center in Carson, California. Against Cruz Azul, the match ended in a 2–1 win for Guadalajara, with Salcido playing the entire match. Salcido made his first league appearance for Guadalajara 20 July 2014 in a match against Chiapas and played for the entire match. He scored his first goal from a penalty against bitter rivals America, on 24 November 2016. On 14 October 2017, He scored a 94th minute own goal vs Morelia which decreased the chances of Chivas qualifying for the playoffs which started a crisis from 2017 to 2020 where they would miss out on playoffs until Apertura 2020 reaching the semis.

Veracruz
In January 2019, he officially joined Veracruz. On 4 February he made his debut against his former club Guadalajara in a 0–0 draw. He played his final match in the Liga MX on 23 November against his former club Guadalajara in a 1–3 loss.

International career

Salcido debuted with Mexico 8 September 2004 in a 2006 world cup qualifying match against Trinidad and Tobago, he soon established himself with the number 3 shirt as the national sides first choice left back. He has gone on to appear in several international competitions with Mexico. In 2005, he played in the Confederations Cup in Germany, helping the national team to a fourth-place finish, where he appeared as a starter in all five matches. During a semi-final match against Argentina, Salcido scored a goal in extra time. He recovered the ball in the Mexican area, dribbled it past three defenders while going the entire length of the pitch, then scored after the shot fooled keeper Germán Lux when it bounced off Fabricio Coloccini.

Salcido was included in the 24-man squad selected on 2 April 2006, by head coach Ricardo Lavolpe, to play for the national team in the 2006 FIFA World Cup. Salcido played all four matches during the 2006 FIFA World Cup in Germany.

Salcido was called up by former Mexico national footballer now manager Hugo Sánchez for the 2007 Gold Cup. He announced that he would not participate in the 2007 Copa America with the team because he needed rest. He played in the final of the Gold Cup, where Mexico finished runner-up against rivals the United States. He was included in the tournament's All-Tournament Team.

Salcido played all four games at the 2010 World Cup in South Africa.

Salcido was one of the three over age players selected for the 2012 Summer Olympics. He won the gold medal with the Olympic team.

Salcido's inclusion into Mexico's 2014 FIFA World Cup roster was a surprise to the player and to analysts alike. He made his only start during the knockout stage against the Netherlands replacing the suspended José Juan Vázquez.

Salcido announced his retirement from international football on 29 August 2014.

Post playing career
In May 2020, he was named as the first president of the Liga de Balompié Mexicano. Following various issues that plagued the first season, he resigned in January 2021. A month following his departure, he presented a project for a new football league, named Liga Top.

Career statistics

Club
Updated 29 August 2014

1.Salcido was an unused substitute in 4 Eredivisie and 2 Europa League matches.

International

International goals
Scores and results list Mexico's goal tally first.

Honours
PSV
Eredivisie: 2006–07, 2007–08
Johan Cruyff Shield: 2008

UANL
Mexican Primera División: Apertura 2011
Copa MX: Clausura 2014

Guadalajara
Liga MX: Clausura 2017
Copa MX: Apertura 2015, Clausura 2017
Supercopa MX: 2016
CONCACAF Champions League: 2018

Mexico Olympic
Olympic Gold Medal: 2012

Mexico
CONCACAF Gold Cup: 2011

Individual
Mexican Primera División Full-back of the Season: 2004–05
Mexican Primera División Special Recognition Award: Clausura 2007
CONCACAF Gold Cup All-Tournament Team: 2007

See also
 List of men's footballers with 100 or more international caps

References

External links

 
 
 
 
 
 
 
 

1980 births
Living people
People from Ocotlán, Jalisco
Footballers from Jalisco
Mexican expatriate footballers
Mexican footballers
Association football defenders
Mexico international footballers
2005 FIFA Confederations Cup players
2005 CONCACAF Gold Cup players
2006 FIFA World Cup players
2007 CONCACAF Gold Cup players
2010 FIFA World Cup players
2011 CONCACAF Gold Cup players
Footballers at the 2012 Summer Olympics
2013 FIFA Confederations Cup players
2014 FIFA World Cup players
CONCACAF Gold Cup-winning players
Liga MX players
C.D. Guadalajara footballers
Expatriate footballers in the Netherlands
Eredivisie players
PSV Eindhoven players
Mexican expatriate sportspeople in the Netherlands
Fulham F.C. players
Mexican expatriate sportspeople in England
Expatriate footballers in England
Premier League players
Tigres UANL footballers
FIFA Century Club
Olympic footballers of Mexico
Olympic gold medalists for Mexico
Olympic medalists in football
Medalists at the 2012 Summer Olympics
Indigenous Mexicans